Shimun VIII Yohannan Sulaqa (also Yohannan d'Bēth Bello, John Soulaqa, Sulaka or Sulacha; circa 1510–1555) was the first Patriarch of what was to become the Shemon line of Chaldean Catholic Church, from 1553 to 1555, after it absorbed this Church of the East patriarchate into full communion with the Holy See and the Catholic Church.

Yohannan Sulaqa's ascension as Patriarch was part of the 1552 schism in the Church of the East which resulted in the establishment of rival patriarchates and ultimately a permanent rift in the Church of the East. He was elected by those who opposed the hereditary patriarchal succession within the Eliya family, and he took an unprecedented step in the Church of the East: he traveled to Rome, accepted the Catholic creed and was consecrated as Patriarch in 1553, after at first failing in an attempt to join the Syriac Orthodox Church. His reign did not last long though. Upon his return, due to strong opposition by the opposing Patriarch, Sulaqa was imprisoned by the Ottoman leader of Amadiya, tortured, and executed in January 1555. He is considered a martyr of the Catholic Church.

Background
Up until the Schism of 1552, the Church of the East was united in a single patriarchate and the episcopal see was located in the ancient city of Alqosh. However, by the end of 15th century the Patriarch Shimun IV Basidi (1437–1493) decided to make the office hereditary in his own family, the Eliya line.

This was made possible through the ancient canon law of the Church of the East, which decreed that only metropolitan bishops could confirm a patriarch. As a result, Shimun IV and his successor only appointed their family members as metropolitan bishops, in order for the uncle to choose his brothers or nephews to succeed him as patriarch. This designated successor, once consecrated as metropolitan bishop with right of succession, was called natar kursi.

The patriarch Shemon VII Ishoyahb, consecrated either towards the end of 1538 or early in 1539, was highly unpopular due to his illicit activities and profligate life, selling church properties and allowing the use of concubines. Furthermore, he consecrated his own nephews at the ages of twelve and fifteen as metropolitan bishops. These actions led to wide protest causing further upheaval and instability in the church.

Life
Yohannan Sulaqa (The name "Sulaqa" means "Ascension") was born c. 1510 in the Mosul region of northern Mesopotamia. Around 1540 he became abbot of Rabban Hormizd Monastery near Alqosh. A single source, Abdisho IV Maron, says he was a monk of the monastery of Sabrishoʿ at Beth Qoqa, near Arbela.

Widespread complaints emerged against Shimun VII's consecration of his younger nephew as his designated successor. This led to three non-related bishops of Shimun VII (the bishops of Erbil, Urmia and Salmas) calling an assembly in Mosul of clergy, monks, and church members from ten regions to elect the hesitant Yohannan Sulaqa as the new patriarch. However, A bishop of metropolitan rank was needed at the ceremony in order to consecrate Sulaqa as patriarch. As the Eliya family would obviously object to it, Yohannan Sulaqa made the decision of asking Pope Julius III of Rome to celebrate the consecration.

Yohannan Sulaqa, along with seventy delegates, traveled to Jerusalem to meet the Custodian of the Holy Land. The group managed to persuade the Franciscan friars that they agreed with the Catholic faith, and expressed the desire to have Sulaqa confirmed as patriarch by the pope. The Friars gave them a letter of presentation to the pope and Sulaqa traveled to Rome, where Andreas Masius gave him assistance as a translator in the court of Pope Julius III.

Yohannan Sulaqa requested that the pope consecrate him as patriarch. He justified this request by saying that, after Shemon VII Ishoyahb's death in 1551, his 8-year-old nephew who was his designated successor also died. For this reason many historians such as Eugène Tisserant, Tfinkdji, and Fiey postulate the existence of one Shimun (VIII) who reigned in Alqosh from 1552 to 1558. Becchetti himself says that in reality the designated successor was neither an 8-year-old nor was he dead. More recent scholars such as Habbi and Lampar, suggest that Shimun VII did not die in 1551 but reigned till 1558, and that Sulaqa had lied to the pope.

On February 20, 1553, Yohannan Sulaqa made a profession of faith in front of the Pope. On April 9, 1553, he was consecrated as bishop in St. Peter's Basilica in Rome by Cardinal John Álvarez y Alva de Toledo, OP (1488–1557) (or by the pope himself according other sources). Sulaqa's appointment as patriarch was ratified by the papal bull entitled "Divina disponente clementia". In the course of the papal consistory held on April 28, 1553, Sulaqa received the pallium, i.e., the sign of his patriarchal authority, from the hands of the pope.

He took the regnal name Shimun (VIII), a name adopted by all his successors, except his immediate successor, until the late 20th century. The successors of Shimun VII all took the name Eliya.

Yohannan Sulaqa traveled back via Constantinople to the northern town of Amid (modern Diyarbakır), where he arrived on November 12, 1553, and established his See. He was accompanied by the bishop Ambrose Buttigeg, OP († 1558), a powerful Maltese clergyman, who was specially appointed as "Nuncio for Mosul".

However, in January 1555 he was summoned, imprisoned for many months, tortured and executed, probably by drowning, by the local pasha of Amadiya instigated by the partisans of Shimun VII. He had just ordained five metropolitans as the basis of a new church structure. In the Catholic Church, he is often considered a martyr, but has not been officially declared such by inclusion of his name in the Roman Martyrology.

Sulaqa's brother, Joseph Mar (Sulaqa) of India, held the office from 1556 to 1569 of Metropolitan of the Saint Thomas Christians in South India.

Title
Yohannan Sulaqa was pointedly given the title of "Patriarch of Mosul and Athur" in Rome, not in a restrictive sense, but meaning of the Church of the East, and at that time, Kerala aside, was exclusive to northern Mesopotamia, the former Assyria. The Chronicle of the Carmelites states that Sulaqa was proclaimed Patriarch of the Eastern Assyrians but on April 19, 1553, the title was changed to Patriarch of the Chaldeans. This was in reference to the Old Testament which gives Abraham's birthplace as "Ur of Chaldees" (traditionally Edessa) at a time long before the Chaldeans entered Mesopotamia. This did not signify any ethnic or geographic link with the long extinct Chaldeans of the south eastern extremities of Iraq.  Many modern scholars also now believe Abraham's Ur was actually in Anatolia.

The term "Chaldeans" had a history of being used in an ethnically and geographically inaccurate sense by Rome, having been previously officially used by the Council of Florence in 1445 as a new name for a group of Greek Nestorians of Cyprus who entered into full communion with the Catholic Church. Rome followed to use the term Chaldeans to indicate the members of the Church of the East in Communion with Rome (mainly not to use the term Nestorian that was theologically unacceptable) also in 1681 for Joseph I and later in 1830 when Yohannan VIII Hormizd of the line of Alqosh became the first Patriarch of Babylon of the Chaldeans of the modern Chaldean Catholic Church.

"Pope Julian III in 1553 consecrated Sulâka, an Assyrian convert, "Patriarch of the Chaldeans" – the designation then given for the first time to the so-called Nestorians who had seceded to Rome, which patriarchate has been continued to this present day."

Shemʿon line
Shimun VIII Yohannan Sulaqa was the first incumbent of the Shemon line of the Church of the East. This patriarchal See was initially located in Amid, but very soon moved to Siirt, then to Urmia, then to Khosrowa (near Salmas) and from the second half of 17th century to Qodchanis (now Konak, Hakkari).

The last patriarch of this line recognized by the pope was Shimun IX Dinkha (died 1600) and later there were only a few correspondences through missionaries. This See reintroduced in 1600 the traditional heredity system for patriarchal' succession, a practice unacceptable to Rome. In 1692, patriarch Shimun XIII Dinkha broke formally the communion with Rome and returned his members to the faith that he abandoned, but without accepting the patriarchal line that he broke away from. The patriarchate that he originated is that which in 1976 adopted the name "Assyrian Church of the East".

See also
Schism of 1552
List of Chaldean Catholic Patriarchs of Babylon

Notes

Sources

External links
 http://www.chaldeancatholics.com

1555 deaths
16th-century Eastern Catholic archbishops
Assyrians from the Ottoman Empire
16th-century Roman Catholic martyrs
Chaldean Catholic Patriarchs of Babylon
People executed by drowning
Year of birth uncertain
16th-century executions by the Ottoman Empire
Bishops in the Ottoman Empire
16th-century people from the Ottoman Empire
1510 births
People from Mosul